The Sidi El Haloui Mosque (or Sidi el-Halwi Mosque) is a historic mosque and religious complex in Tlemcen, Algeria.

History 
The mosque is dedicated to Abou Abdallah Echoudsy, known as Sidi el Haloui, a qadi from Seville who came to Tlemcen in the late 13th century. He was later accused of sorcery, probably as part of a defamatory plot, and executed either in 1305 or 1337. Following the rehabilitation of his reputation, the Marinid sultan Abu Inan erected this religious complex next to his mausoleum in 1353 or 1354 (754 AH).

Architecture 
The historical complex consists of a mosque, the tomb of Sidi el Haloui built next to it, and an ablutions facility across the road. The complex also formerly included a madrasa and a zawiya, but this has not survived. The mausoleum is a modest structure. The ablutions hall, still standing today, is covered by a central dome and contained latrines. 

The mosque's design is highly similar to the Sidi Boumediene Mosque, built by Abu Inan's father Abu al-Hasan in the area of Tlemcen over a decade earlier. It consists of a square courtyard (sahn) with a central fountain and surrounded by an arcaded gallery (riwaq), while on the south side of this is the prayer hall, a hypostyle hall divided by rows of pointed horseshoe arches into five naves or aisles. Unlike the Sidi Boumediene Mosque, the arches are not supported by pillars but by onyx columns. The columns were most likely taken from the former Palace of Victory at al-Mansourah, which was built by Abu al-Hasan. (Some of these columns are also found in the mausoleum of Sidi Boumediene, probably added by Abu Inan there around the same time.) In the middle of the southeast wall is the mihrab, a hexagonal niche covered by a small muqarnas cupola. The mosque's minaret, approximately 25 metres high, stands at the northwest corner and its façades are decorated by interlacing sebka motifs. The rest of the mosque's original decoration, around the arches of the prayer hall and the outer entrance portal, has not been preserved.

References 

14th-century mosques
Mosques in Tlemcen
Marinid architecture